Kashabowie is an unincorporated place and Compact Rural Community in southwestern Thunder Bay District in Northwestern Ontario, Canada. It is on the Canadian National Railway Kashabowie Subdivision main line, built originally as the Canadian Northern Railway transcontinental main line, between the railway points of Planet to the west and Postans to the east, and has a passing siding.

References

Communities in Thunder Bay District